The Satellite Award for Best Director is one of the annual Satellite Awards given by the International Press Academy.

Winners and nominees

1990s

2000s

2010s

2020s

Multiple winners 
Only 2 directors has won the award multiple times.

References

External links
 Official website

Director
Awards for best director
Awards established in 1996